Fighting Season is a 2018 Australian television drama series that screened on Foxtel's Showcase channel. The series is a mystery drama involving Australian soldiers returning on leave from deployment in Afghanistan. The six-part series is written by Blake Ayshford.

Cast

Main
 Jay Ryan as Sergent Sean "Speedo" Collins
 Ewen Leslie as Captain Edward "Ted" Nordenfelt
 Kate Mulvany as Captain Kim Nordenfelt
 Sarah Armanious as Vanessa Collins
 Marco Alosio as Private Isara'elu "Izzy" Ulalei
 George Pullar as Private Jarrod "Toast" Vogel
 Julian Maroun as Corporal Peter "Pepsi" Aboud

Supporting

Episodes

References

External links 
 Fighting Season - Foxtel
 

Showcase (Australian TV channel) original programming
Australian drama television series
2018 Australian television series debuts